"Nothing's Changed" is a poem by Tatamkhulu Afrika. It is part of the AQA GCSE Anthology.

References
http://www.bbc.co.uk/schools/gcsebitesize/english/poemscult/afrikarev1.shtml

South African poetry